Centerville Independent School District is a public school district located in Trinity County, Texas, USA. It is a small school with an attendance of fewer than 175 students.

In 2009, the school district was rated "recognized" by the Texas Education Agency.

References

External links
Centerville ISD

School districts in Trinity County, Texas